Jana Teschke (born 22 September 1990) is a German field hockey player. She represented her country at the 2016 Summer Olympics.

References

External links
 
 
 

1990 births
Living people
German female field hockey players
Field hockey players at the 2016 Summer Olympics
Olympic field hockey players of Germany
Olympic bronze medalists for Germany
Olympic medalists in field hockey
Medalists at the 2016 Summer Olympics
Female field hockey midfielders
Field hockey players from Hamburg
21st-century German women